Ali Mohamed Hufane (born 1960) is a long-distance runner who competed internationally for Somalia.

Hufane competed at the 1984 Summer Olympics in Los Angeles, he entered the 5000 metres but didn't finish the race, so he didn't advance to the next round. He competed collegiately for Fairleigh Dickinson.

References

1960 births
Living people
Olympic athletes of Somalia
Athletes (track and field) at the 1984 Summer Olympics
Somalian male long-distance runners
Somalian sportsmen